Steven Liv, better known as Hans Sama, is a French professional League of Legends player for G2 Esports. Liv has previously played for Team Liquid in the League of Legends Championship Series (LCS), as well as Rogue and Misfits in the League of Legends European Championship (LEC).

Professional career

Misfits 

Hans joined Misfits at age 16, in June 2016. At the time, Misfits new organization in the European Challenger Series (CS). The team placed first in the CS regular season, and were eligible for the European promotion tournament, where they defeated FC Schalke 04 and claimed their spot in the EU LCS; the highest level of professional play in Europe. At the end of the year, Hans signed a  2-year contract with Misfits, before even playing a single game in the EU LCS.

The following year, Hans and Misfits found spring success, qualifying for playoffs and reaching the Semifinals, and in summer, they made it all the way to the finals match, before falling to G2. However, due to their combined fourth and second place finishes, the team automatically qualified for the 2017 League of Legends World Championship as Europe's second seed. At Worlds 2017, Misfits advanced past the group stage with a 3–3 record, and met tournament favorites SKT T1 in the Quarterfinals. Despite being heavy underdogs, Hans and Misfits held up against the Korean squad, taking the series to a full five games before losing a close Game 5, and drew praise from the league community for their impressive showing, despite the loss.

After proving themselves a contender on the international stage, Misfits performed poorly in spring 2018, and finished the regular season with a 8–10 record, missing playoffs. In summer they rebounded enough to return to the postseason, but finished in fourth after losing the third place match to Vitality. Due to his teams results, Hans did not attend Worlds in 2018.

In 2019, Misfits brought together an impressive lineup, including sOAZ, Febiven, and GorillA, while retaining Hans and Maxlore, and were expected to once again be competitive internationally. However the team flopped, placing eighth in spring and ninth in summer, with a combined 12–21 record on the year, making no playoff appearances and attending no international events. Halfway through the summer split, Misfits substituted out the entire starting roster, including Hans, but did not see improvement. Misfits broke up after an extremely disappointing 2019 season, and Hans left the team.

Rogue 

Hans joined Rogue ahead of the 2020 LEC season. In the spring split, Rogue made the playoffs, claiming the last spot with a 9–9 record, but lost in the second round. In summer however, Rogue went 13–5 achieving first place in the LEC and qualifying for Worlds 2020. But in the first round of the playoffs, they were swept by Fnatic and dropped to the lower bracket. They won their next series against MAD Lions, before losing to G2 and finishing third, giving them the third seed at the World Championship. At the tournament, Rogue went 1–5 in the group stage, placing last in their group and finishing 13th–14th.

In January 2021, Hans resigned with Rogue through the end of the 2022 season. When spring started, Hans and Rogue once again enjoyed regular season success, going 14–4 and tying with G2 for the best record in the LEC. In playoffs, despite losing their first match to MAD Lions, Rogue went on to defeat FC Schalke 04 and G2 to make finals, where they lost their rematch against MAD Lions in a close 5 game series. In the Summer split, Rogue finishing the regular season in first, at 13–5, marking the third straight split in which Hans' team won 13 or more games. In they playoffs, Rogue defeated Misfits in the first round, which qualified them for the 2021 World Championship, before being swept by both MAD Lions and Fnatic, giving them a third place finish. At Worlds 2021, Rogue were drawn into Group A, which contained both of the tournament favorites, and winners of the two previous World Championships: China's FunPlusPhoenix and Korea's Damwon Kia. This group wad dubbed the "Group of death" by the media, and along with North America's Cloud9, Rogue were not expected to be able to advance. However at the end of the double–round–robin, Damwon held a 6–0 record, while the other three teams, including Rogue, were tied at 2–4 each. Rogue upset FPX in the first tiebreaker, before falling to Cloud9 in the second, failing to qualify for the knockout stage.

Team Liquid 

After Worlds concluded, Team Liquid of the LCS acquired Hans Sama from Rogue, buying out his contract for an undisclosed amount. In the preseason Lock–In tournament, Hans did not play in all the games, as the team rotated their roster. Team Liquid's support and Hans' botlaner partner, CoreJJ, had not yet received his green card, and the team could only play two non-resident players, therefore the team rotated between Bwipo, Hans, and CoreJJ. Despite not having their full roster, Team Liquid won the Lock–In tournament, defeating Evil Geniuses 3–0 in the finals. On February 16, CoreJJ acquired his green card.

Hans sama left Team Liquid at the end of the season after failing to qualify for the 2022 World Championship.

G2 Esports 
For the 2023 season, Hans signed with G2 Esports. During his first split back in the European region, Hans won his maiden LEC title, defeating MAD Lions in the final 3–0 to qualify for the 2023 Mid-Season Invitational.

References

League of Legends AD Carry players
Living people
1990s births
Misfits Gaming players
Team Liquid players
French esports players